Ladislaus V of Hungary may refer to:

 Ladislaus the Posthumous (1440-1457), also known as Ladislaus of Bohemia and Hungary, King of Bohemia, Hungary, and Croatia; and Duke of Austria
 Wenceslaus III of Bohemia (1289-1306), King of Hungary, Bohemia, and Poland, who took the name Ladislaus V

See also
Ladislaus (disambiguation)